Yem Ponhearith (born 7 July 1960) is a Cambodian politician and was elected a Member of Parliament for Prey Veng in 2008. He is the Chairman of the Commission on Education, Youth, Sport, Religious Affairs, Culture and Tourism.

In 2018 police and officials from the Phnom Penh Culture Department seized copies of two books by Ponhearith -  Human Value and, Vision to National Reconciliation and Social Arrangement. The books were published in France. According to the director of the culture department, Ponhearith had not obtained the required license for the book to be published.

References

1960 births
Living people
Cambodia National Rescue Party politicians
Human Rights Party (Cambodia) politicians
Members of the National Assembly (Cambodia)
People from Takéo province